Edda Dell'Orso (born Edda Sabatini; February 16, 1935) is an Italian singer known for her collaboration with composer Ennio Morricone, for whom she provided wordless vocals to a large number of his film scores. Dell'Orso also provided vocals to scores of other Italian composers such as Bruno Nicolai, Piero Piccioni, Luis Bacalov and Roberto Pregadio. She was born in Genoa.

In Morricone's film scores of the original Spaghetti Westerns directed by Sergio Leone, her dramatic voice was deployed as an instrument for the first time and to revolutionary effect, such as in A Fistful of Dollars, The Good, the Bad, and the Ugly (in particular for "The Ecstasy of Gold" track) and Once Upon a Time in the West.

More recently, Dell'Orso collaborated with Italian composer Alex Puddu on the albums Registrazioni al Buio (2013, Schema Records), In the Eye Of The Cat (2016, Schema Records), The Mark of the Devil (2017, Al Dente) and The Gambler (2018).

Filmography

Notes

External links

Soundtracks with Dell'Orso

1935 births
Living people
Italian women singers